Apolinar is a masculine given name which may refer to:

 Apolinar de Jesús Soto Quesada (1827–1911), Bolivian politician
 Apolinar Serrano (1833–1876), Spanish bishop of Havana
 Apolinar Velez (1865–1939), Filipino politician

See also
 Apolinar's wren, endemic to the Andean regions of Colombia
 Apollinaris (disambiguation)

Spanish masculine given names